"Torn" is a song by Swedish singer Lisa Ajax. The song was performed for the first time in Melodifestivalen 2019, where it made it to the final and subsequently finished in ninth place.

Charts

References

2019 singles
English-language Swedish songs
Melodifestivalen songs of 2019
Swedish pop songs